This article lists people belonging to the Maratha caste.

Rulers and Chiefs

 Chhatrapati Shivaji Maharaj, (1627/1630–1680), founder and first Chhatrapati  of the Maratha Empire.
 Venkoji, Founder of the Thanjavur Kingdom, half-brother of Shivaji.
Sambhaji, (1657–1689), son of Shivaji; second Chhatrapati of Maratha Empire.
Tarabai (née Mohite) (1675–1761), led Maratha resistance against the Mughals after the death of her husband, Rajaram I.Set up the Kolhapur house of Bhonsle and acted as regent for her young son, Shivaji II from 1700 to 1712.
Shahu I(1682-1749), was in prison until 1707 . Released after aurangzeb's death, he fought and defeated his aunt tarabai and became fifth and last  Chattrapati of maratha empire. Made balaji vishwanath peshwa and died in 1749. It ended rule of Chattrapati and started rule of peshwa.
 Rajarshi Shahu (1874 – 1922), ruler of the princely state of Kolhapur and a social reformer.
 Maloji Bhosale (1552–1606, 1620 or 1622), Jagirdar and General under the Ahmadnagar Sultanate, first Bhosale to receive the title of Raje.
 Shahaji Raje Bhonsle (1594–1664), father of Shivaji. Jagirdar and General under the Ahmadnagar Sultanate and Adilshahi.
  Jijabai Bhosale (née Jadhav), (1598–1674), wife of Shahaji Raje Bhosale and mother of Shivaji.
 Hambirrao Mohite (1640–1687), Commander-in-chief, also known as Sarnobat, who took the side of Sambhaji even though he was brother of Soyarabai and fought against Mughals.
 Santaji Ghorpade (1660–1696), one of the most trusted general of Rajaram.
 Dhanaji Jadhav (1650[1]–1708), Commander-in-chief of Maratha forces under Rajaram and Tarabai, who led the fight against the Mughal Empire.
 Khanderao Dabhade ( –1729), Commander-in-chief who led the Marathas into Gujarat.
 Mahadaji Shinde (1730–1792), Maratha ruler of the state of Gwalior in central India. De facto ruler of the Mughal empire in 1780s He was the fifth and youngest son of Sardar Ranoji Scindia.

Indian armed forces
 Major Rama Raghoba Rane, awarded the Param Vir Chakra

Modern politics 
 Sharad Pawar (12 December 1940 –) - former Minister of Agriculture and Minister of Consumer Affairs in the Indian Central Government, formerly Defence Minister of India and thrice Chief Minister of Maharashtra; Food and Public Distribution, India and former BCCI President and ICC President.
 Madhavrao Scindia/Shinde (10 March 1945 – 30 September 2001)- Former Congress leader, Minister of Human Resource Development, Minister of Tourism and Minister of Civil Aviation
 Yashwantrao Balwantrao Chavan (12 March 1913 – 25 November 1984) - first Chief Minister of Maharashtra, fifth Deputy Prime Minister of India, Minister of Home Affairs,  Minister of External Affairs,  Minister of Defence and Minister of Finance
 Vasantdada Patil (13 November 1917 – 1 March 1989) - former Chief Minister of Maharashtra
 Shankarrao Chavan (14 July 1920 – 26 February 2004) - former Chief Minister of Maharashtra Minister of Home Affairs.
 Patangrao Kadam   (8 January 1944 – 9 March 2018) - a prominent Indian politician of Indian National Congress, Forest minister of Maharashtra government; founder of Bharti Vidyapeeth, a deemed university
 Pratibha Patil is Indian lawyer and politician who was the first woman to serve as President of India (2007–12).
 Vilasrao Deshmukh (26 May 1945 – 14 August 2012) - former Chief Minister of Maharashtra
 Balasaheb Vikhe Patil  (10 April 1932 – 30 December 2016) - former member of the Indian Parliament and member of Indian National Congress
 Ranjitsinh Pratapsinh Gaekwad (8 May 1938 – 10 May 2012) - was an Indian politician and the Maharaja of Baroda
 B. J. Khatal-Patil (26 March 1919 – 16 September 2019) - former Maharashtra Cabinet Minister, Politician and Independence Activist 
 Jyotiraditya Scindia/Shinde is currently Serving as Minister of Civil Aviation
 Eknath Shinde is currently Serving as Chief Minister of Maharashtra

Sports personalities
• Ajinkya Rahane

• Ruturaj Gaikwad

• Aditya Tare

• Kiran More

• Rohan Kadam

• Sagarika Ghatge

• Kedar Jadhav

• Sukant Kadam

See also
 List of Marathi Buddhists
 List of Marathi Brahmins

References

Maratha
Maratha
Maratha